The following lists events that happened during 1997 in New Zealand.

Population
 Estimated population as of 31 December: 3,802,700
 Increase since 31 December 1996: 40,400 (1.07%)
 Males per 100 Females: 97.1

Incumbents

Regal and viceregal
Head of State – Elizabeth II
Governor-General – The Rt Hon. Sir Michael Hardie Boys GNZM, GCMG, QSO

Government
The 45th New Zealand Parliament continued. Government was The National Party, led by Jim Bolger, in coalition with New Zealand First, led by Winston Peters.

Speaker of the House – Doug Kidd
Prime Minister – Jim Bolger then Jenny Shipley
Deputy Prime Minister – Winston Peters
Minister of Finance – Bill Birch
Minister of Foreign Affairs – Don McKinnon
Chief Justice — Sir Thomas Eichelbaum

Parliamentary leaders
Labour  – (37 seats) Helen Clark (Leader of the Opposition)
Alliance –  (13 seats) Jim Anderton
ACT New Zealand – (8 seats) Richard Prebble
United New Zealand- (1 seat) Peter Dunne

Main centre leaders
Mayor of Auckland – Les Mills
Mayor of Hamilton – Margaret Evans
Mayor of Wellington – Mark Blumsky
Mayor of Christchurch – Vicki Buck
Mayor of Dunedin – Sukhi Turner

Events 
8 February: Stephen Anderson, 24, shoots 11 people, killing 6 of them (including his wife and parents) at Raurimu.
16 July: List MP Alamein Kopu resigns from the Alliance Party but remains a member of parliament. This causes controversy because Kopu has signed contracts with the party that she would resign from Parliament should she leave the party.
10 September: Parliament's privileges committee finds that Alamein Kopu is entitled to remain an independent MP.
 Argentina reopens its embassy in Wellington (closed since 1982).

Arts and literature
Paddy Richardson wins the Robert Burns Fellowship.
Montana New Zealand Book Awards:
Book of the Year/Cultural Heritage: Jessie Munro, The Story of Suzanne Aubert
First Book Awards
Fiction: Dominic Sheehan, Finding Home
Poetry: Diane Brown, Before the Divorce We Go To Disneyland
Non-Fiction: Jessie Munro, The Story of Suzanne Aubert

See 1997 in art, 1997 in literature, :Category:1997 books

Music

New Zealand Music Awards
Winners are shown first with nominees underneath.

 Album of the Year: Strawpeople – Vicarious
Emma Paki – Oxygen of Love
Garageland – Last Exit to Garageland
OMC
The Mutton Birds – Envy of Angels
 Single of the Year: DLT Featuring Che Fu – Chains
Bic Runga – Bursting Through
Garageland
Strawpeople – Taller Than God
The Mutton Birds
 Best Male Vocalist: Che Fu – Chains
Jeremy Eade (Garageland)
Jon Toogood (Shihad)
 Best Female Vocalist: Bic Runga
Emma Paki
Fiona McDonald (Strawpeople)
 Best Group: Garageland
Shihad
The Mutton Birds
 Most Promising Male Vocalist: Daniel Haimona (Dam Native)
Andrew Tilby (Breathe)
Ed Cake (Bressa Creeting Cake)
 Most Promising Female Vocalist: Lole Usoalii
Andrea Cook
Maryanne Antonuvich (D Faction)
 Most Promising Group: Dam Native
Bike
Bressa Creeting Cake
Cinematic
 International Achievement: OMC
Crowded House
Jane Campion
Peter Jackson
 Best Video: Sigi Spath & Joe Lonie – if I Had My Way (Supergroove)
Kevin Sprig – La La Land (Shihad)
Jonathan King – Behold My Kool Style (Damn Native)
 Best Producer: Malcolm Welsford / Karl Steven – Backspacer (Supergroove)
Alan Jansson – How Bizarre
Eddie Raynor – ENZSO
 Best Engineer: Rick Huntington / Alan Jansson – How Bizarre (OMC)
Chris Van Der Geer (Strawpeople)
Malcolm Welsford – Backspacer (Supergroove)
 Best Jazz Album: Bluetrain – No Free Lunch
Jazz in the Present Tense – Jazz in the Present Tense
Nairobi Trio – Shelf Life
 Best Classical Album: the Nzso, Janos Furst, Michael Houston – Live : Tower Beethoven Festival
New Zealand String Quartet – Bartok String Quartet 1–5
Alexander Ivashin & Tama Vesmas – Sergie Prokofiev
 Best Country Album: Coalrangers – Coast to CoastDennis Marsh – Out of NashvilleBartlett, Dugan, Vaughan – Together Again Best Folk Album: Wild Geese – Betwixt Time and PlaceMichael Scorey – Angel StationBob Bickerton – Music in the Glen Best Gospel Album: Max Jacobson – FoundThe Lands – Arbor DayEvan Silva – Aint No Two Ways About It Best Mana Maori Album: Emma Paki – Oxygen of LoveDLT – The True SchoolDam Native – Behold My Kool Style Best Mana Reo Album: St Josephs Maori Girls College – a Gift of SongTe Kura Tuatahi Me Te Ropu Kapahaka O Ranana – Te Wainui A RuaTurakina Maori Girls College – Mana Wahine Best Childrens Album: Universal Childrens Audio – Waiata KarahereHelen Willberg – Ranona MoemoeaLove To Sing Choir – Love My First Songbook Best Polynesian Album: Annie Crummer – Seventh WaveFelise Mikaele -Se TaitauThe Five Stars – Samoa Ea Best Songwriter: Dl Thompson, C Ness, A McNaughton, K Rangihuna – Chains (DLT Feat Che Fu)
Paul Casserley, Fiona McDonald, Greg Johnson – Boxers (Strawpeople)
Bic Runga – Bursting Through
 Best Cover: Wayne Conway – ENZSO (ENZSO)
Jeremy Takacs, Karl & Jon – Shihad
Rick Huntington And Alan Jansson – How Bizarre (OMC)

See: 1997 in music

Performing arts

 Benny Award presented by the Variety Artists Club of New Zealand to Paul Bennett.

Radio and television
CanWest takes complete ownership of TV3 and launches TV4.
TVNZ broadcasts MTV.
July: Prime Television in Australia purchases 34 licences covering all major New Zealand centres.

See: 1997 in New Zealand television, 1997 in television, List of TVNZ television programming, :Category:Television in New Zealand, TV3 (New Zealand), :Category:New Zealand television shows, Public broadcasting in New Zealand

Film
Lost Valley
Topless Women Talk About Their Lives

See: :Category:1997 film awards, 1997 in film, List of New Zealand feature films, Cinema of New Zealand, :Category:1997 films

Internet

See: NZ Internet History

Sport

Athletics
Peter Buske wins his first national title in the men's marathon, clocking 2:20:49 on 8 March in New Plymouth, while Terri-Lee Farr claims her first in the women's championship (2:55:20).
Beatrice Faumuina became the first New Zealander to win an event at a World Athletics Championships.

Basketball
 The Men's NBL was won by the Auckland Stars
 Tall Blacks

Cricket
 Various Tours, New Zealand cricket team

Golf
 New Zealand Open won by Greg Turner

Horse racing

Harness racing
 New Zealand Trotting Cup: Iraklis
 Auckland Trotting Cup: Kate's First

Thoroughbred racing

Netball
 Silver Ferns
 National Bank Cup

Rugby league

 The Auckland Warriors competed in the breakaway Super League and finished 7th out of 10 teams.
 Waikato won the Super League Challenge Cup, defeating Canterbury 34–18 in the final. Waikato also won the Rugby League Cup.
25 April, New Zealand lost to Australia 22–34
26 September, New Zealand defeated Australia 30-12

Rugby union
 Super 12
 Rugby Union World Cup
 National Provincial Championship
 Bledisloe Cup
 Tri Nations Series
 Ranfurly Shield

Shooting
Ballinger Belt – Ross Geange (Masterton)

Soccer
 The Chatham Cup is won by Central United who beat Napier City Rovers 3–2 in the final (after extra time).

Births

January–February
 3 January – Jacob Cowley, rugby union player
 7 January – Dylan Schmidt, trampolinist
 10 January – Patrick Herbert, rugby league player
 20 January – James Munro, motor racing driver
 21 January – Josh Clarkson, cricketer
 23 January – Duncan Campbell, snowboarder
 24 January
 Hailey Duff, Scottish curler
 Jordan Uelese, rugby union player
 3 February – Paige Hourigan, tennis player
 11 February – Rosé, singer
 12 February 
 Anna Grimaldi, athlete
 Clayton Lewis, association footballer
 13 February – Sevu Reece, rugby union player
 17 February – Jordie Barrett, rugby union player

March–April
 1 March
 Nick Kwant, cricketer
 Niccolo Tagle, badminton player
 3 March – Du'Plessis Kirifi, rugby union player
 5 March – Kemara Hauiti-Parapara, rugby union player
 11 March – Ata Hingano, rugby league player
 12 March – Stephen Perofeta, rugby union player
 13 March – Orbyn Leger, rugby union player
 14 March – Sam Dobbs, cyclist
 18 March – Rieko Ioane, rugby union player
 19 March – Zak Gibson, cricketer
 20 March – Bobby Cheng, chess player
 21 March – Moses Dyer, association footballer
 23 March – Sirocco, kakapo
 8 April – Ella Greenslade, rower
 20 April – Luke Jacobson, rugby union player
 23 April – Myer Bevan, association footballer
 24 April – Lydia Ko, golfer
 26 April – Tima Fainga'anuku, rugby union player
 30 April
 Daisy Cleverley, association footballer
 Sam Lane, field hockey player

May–June
 1 May – Terina Te Tamaki, rugby union player
 2 May – Aotearoa Mata'u, rugby union player
 5 May – Asafo Aumua, rugby union player
 6 May – Carlos Garcia Knight, snowboarder
 7 May – Harry Allan, rugby union player
 8 May
 Tahuna Irwin, darts player
 Amanda Jamieson, cyclist
 13 May – Ngatokotoru Arakua, rugby league player
 23 May – Sam Timmins, basketball player
 24 May – Olivia Podmore, cyclist (died 2021)
 30 May
 Ere Enari, rugby union player
 Sitili Tupouniua, rugby league player
 5 June – Ross ter Braak, cricketer
 8 June – James Rolleston, actor
 11 June – Marino Mikaele-Tu'u, rugby union player
 17 June
 KJ Apa, actor
 Pouri Rakete-Stones, rugby union player
 28 June – Henry Cameron, association footballer

July–August
 5 July – Abigail Latu-Meafou, netball player
 9 July – Grace Anderson, cyclist
 16 July
 Braydon Ennor, rugby union player
 Isaia Walker-Leawere, rugby union player
 5 August – Clara van Wel, singer–songwriter
 6 August – Noah Billingsley, association footballer
 12 August – Elizabeth Cui, diver
 19 August – Alex Fidow, rugby union player
 21 August – Sione Katoa, rugby league player

September–October
 9 September – Erin Clark, rugby league player
 10 September – Jacob Pierce, rugby union player
 11 September – Zoe Hobbs, sprinter
 16 September – Martine Puketapu, association footballer
 17 September – Christian Leopard, cricketer
 21 September – Maia Wilson, netball player
 27 September – Hail, Thoroughbred racehorse
 30 September – Ryan Coxon, rugby union player
 1 October
 Troy Johnson, cricketer
 Sam Verlinden, singer
 8 October – Taniela Paseka, rugby league player
 10 October – Josh McKay, rugby union player
 11 October – Dalton Papalii, rugby union player
 23 October – Jaydn Su'A, rugby league player
 30 October – Abbie Palmer, squash player

November–December
 1 November – Kimiora Poi, netball player
 4 November – Bryony Botha, cyclist
 16 November – Ethereal, Thoroughbred racehorse
 21 November – Caleb Aekins, rugby league player
 26 November – Tamati Tua, rugby union player
 7 December – Briton Nikora, rugby league player
 15 December – Stefania Owen, actor
 27 December – Jona Nareki, rugby union player
 31 December
 Peter Umaga-Jensen, rugby union player
 Thomas Umaga-Jensen, rugby union player

Deaths

January–March
 1 January – Nora Crawford, police officer (born 1917)
 2 January – Keith Hay, construction company founder, politician, conservative activist (born 1917)
 10 January – John Rodgers, Roman Catholic bishop (born 1915)
 15 January – Ted Smith, rower (born 1922)
 29 January – Sir Clifford Richmond, jurist (born 1914)
 2 February – Ray Dalton, rugby union player (born 1919)
 26 March – Sir Norman Alexander, physics academic, university administrator (born 1907)

April–June
 8 April – Lord Module, Standardbred racehorse (foaled 1974)
 10 April – Sir Robert Aitken, medical academic, university administrator (born 1901)
 14 April – Count Geoffrey Potocki de Montalk, poet, pretender to the Polish throne (born 1903)
 17 April – Henry Lang, public servant, economics academic (born 1919)
 24 April – Hugh McLean, rugby union player (born 1907)
 25 April – Terry O'Sullivan, rugby union player (born 1936)
 3 May – Bruce Beetham, politician (born 1936)
 7 May – Owen Jensen, musician, composer, music critic and broadcaster (born 1907)
 17 May – James Newhook, veterinary science academic (born 1915)
 21 May – Sir Tristram, thoroughbred racehorse (foaled 1971)
 22 May – Rachael Zister, Māori community leader (born 1893)
 2 June – Oscar Garden, aviator (born 1903)
 14 June – Sir Jack Hunn, public servant (born 1906)
 15 June – Kim Casali, cartoonist (born 1941)
 26 June – Dent Harper, cricketer (born 1937)
 28 June – Jack Hinton, soldier (born 1909)
 29 June – Ian Clarke, rugby union player, referee and administrator (born 1931)

July–September
 3 July – Ron Westerby, rugby league player (born 1920)
 6 July – Brun Smith, cricketer (born 1922)
 8 July – Ray Speed, association football player (born 1914)
 12 July – Frank Shuter, speedway rider (born 1943)
 23 July – David Warbeck, actor (born 1941)
 25 July
 Jack Davies, swimmer (born 1916)
 Matiu Rata, politician (born 1934)
 31 July – Sir Hepi Te Heuheu, Māori leader (born 1919)
 15 August – Dave Solomon, rugby union and league player (born 1913)
 16 August – Kitty Kain, dietician, WAAF leader (born 1908)
 21 August – Jean Horsley, artist (born 1913)
 25 August – James Gould, rower (born 1914)
 5 September – Emily Schuster, master weaver (born 1927)
 17 September – Trevor Redmond, speedway rider (born 1927)
 22 September – Silver Lad, thoroughbred racehorse (foaled 1973)
 23 September – Christopher John Lewis, criminal (born 1964)
 26 September – Geoff Gerard, politician (born 1904)

October–December
 8 October – Desmond Scott, fighter pilot (born 1918)
 11 October – Sidney Koreneff, French resistance worker, newspaper managing director, Anglican priest (born 1918)
 18 October
 David Seath, politician (born 1914)
 Geoff Walker, canoeist, surf lifesaver (born 1952)
 31 October – Adrian Rodda, public servant (born 1911)
 9 November – Margaret Pawson, netball player (born 1940)
 16 November – Roy Sheffield, cricketer (born 1906)
 21 November – Stanley Dallas, radio technician and recording engineer (born 1926)
 27 November – Jim Kershaw, association football player (born 1906)
 6 December – Eva Rickard, Māori land and women's rights activist (born 1925)
 10 December – Ted Coubray, filmmaker (born 1900)

See also
List of years in New Zealand
Timeline of New Zealand history
History of New Zealand
Military history of New Zealand
Timeline of the New Zealand environment
Timeline of New Zealand's links with AntarcticaFor world events and topics in 1997 not specifically related to New Zealand see'': 1997

References

External links

 
New Zealand
Years of the 20th century in New Zealand